The Turkmenoy Oil Field is an oil field located in Mangystau Province. It was discovered in 1997 and developed by Petrom. The oil field is operated and owned by Petrom.

References 

Oil fields of Kazakhstan